Vladimir Nikolayevich Zinich (born 27 September 1968) is a Russian professional football coach and a former player. He is the manager of FC Atom Novovoronezh.

Club career
As a player, he made his debut in the Soviet Second League in 1986 for FC Salyut Belgorod.

References

1968 births
Living people
Soviet footballers
Association football forwards
Russian footballers
FC Salyut Belgorod players
PFC CSKA Moscow players
SKA Odesa players
FC Chornomorets Odesa players
SC Odesa players
Karpaty Krosno players
FC Torpedo Zaporizhzhia players
FC Fakel Voronezh players
Soviet Top League players
Russian Premier League players
Ukrainian Premier League players
Ukrainian First League players
Russian expatriate footballers
Expatriate footballers in Poland
Expatriate footballers in Ukraine
Russian expatriate sportspeople in Poland
Russian expatriate sportspeople in Ukraine
Russian football managers
Sportspeople from Kirov Oblast